Michael or Mike Riordan may refer to:
 Michael Riordan (physicist) (born 1946), American physicist and historian
 Michael H. Riordan (born 1951), American economist
 Michael Paul Riordan (1789–1862), Christian Brother
 Mike Riordan (basketball) (born 1945), American basketball player
 Mike Riordan (American football), American football player

See also
 Michael O'Riordan (1917–2006), founder of the Communist Party of Ireland
 Michael O'Riordan (priest) (1857–1919), Irish priest